German punk is punk rock music and punk subculture in Germany since punk music became popular in the 1970s.

Origins 
When bands like the Sex Pistols and The Clash became popular in West Germany, a number of Punk bands were formed, which led to the creation a German punk scene. Among the first wave of bands were Big Balls and the Great White Idiot (from Hamburg, founded in 1975),  Male (from Düsseldorf, founded in 1976), and PVC (from West Berlin, founded in 1977). Early German punk groups were heavily influenced by UK bands, often writing their lyrics in English. This first wave of German punk bands tended to be musicians first, rather than people motivated by political activism to form bands and learn to play in them.

Beginning in the late 1970s and early 1980s there were new movements within the German punk scene, led by labels like ZickZack Records, from Hamburg. It was during this period that the term Neue Deutsche Welle (New German Wave) was first coined by Alfred Hilsberg, owner of ZickZack Records. Many of these bands played experimental post-punk, often using synthesizers and computers. Among them were The Nina Hagen Band, as well as Fehlfarben (from Düsseldorf) and Abwärts (from Hamburg). Both are still active, though they have changed their style several times. In response to these developments, some bands played a more aggressive style of punk rock, because they did not consider the experimental bands Punk.

1970s 
Kreuzberg has historically been home to the Berlin punk movement as well as other alternative subcultures in Germany. The legendary SO36 club remains a fixture of the Berlin music scene, championing new artists while staying true to its punk past. It originally featured mainly punk music and was often frequented by Iggy Pop and David Bowie.

1980s 
In the 1980s, many new punk bands became popular in the scene and developed the so-called "Deutschpunk" style, which is not a generic term for German punk rock, but an own style of punk music that included primitive songwriting, fast rhythms and politically radical left-wing lyrics influenced by Germany's Nazi past, anarchist sentiments, police violence, working-class desperation and squatter's rights, immigration issues, racism, sexism, and the Cold War. Possibly the most significant Deutschpunk band is Slime from Hamburg, the first German band that had an LP banned. Slime's songs "Deutschland", "Bullenschweine", and "Polizei SA/SS" were banned because they propagated the use of violence against the police or compared the police to the SA and SS of Nazi Germany. While they still had some English lyrics on their first self-titled LP, since their second LP Slime have produced German lyrics. Other popular German punk bands of this era include Razzia from Hamburg, Toxoplasma from Neuwied, Canalterror from Bonn, and Normahl from Stuttgart. Records were released from these bands on a handful of  labels in West Germany: Weird System Recordings from Hamburg, Aggressive Rockproduktionen (AGR) from West Berlin, and Mülleimer Records ("Garbage Can Records") from Stuttgart. During this period, the band Die Toten Hosen from Düsseldorf was founded. Along with Die Ärzte, the Hosen became the most successful and well-known German punk bands, gaining significant international recognition.

During this period, many bands were influenced by U.S. hardcore punk with bands such as Black Flag and The Adolescents. Those bands were also known for their extremely left-wing attitude and aggression in their songs. Some of the most important German hardcore punk bands, who are also often labeled "Deutschpunk", included Vorkriegsjugend from West Berlin, Chaos Z from Stuttgart, Inferno from Augsburg and Blut + Eisen from Hannover. Some bands tried a slower, more elaborate style, inspired by bands like The Wipers, the most popular ones being Torpedo Moskau from Hamburg and a number of singer Jens Rachut's bands, like Angeschissen (1986), Blumen am Arsch der Hölle (1992), Dackelblut (1994) and Oma Hans (2000), also from Hamburg.

Popular compilations of this period were "Keine Experimente!" (Vol. 1-2) (Weird System Recordings) and "Soundtracks zum Untergang" Vol. (1-2) (AGR).

In the mid-1980s, many of the former popular Deutschpunk bands disbanded, which resulted in a new phase, when so-called "Fun punk" got popular in Germany. Bands like Abstürzende Brieftauben from Hannover, Die Mimmi's from Bremen, Die Ärzte from West Berlin or Schließmuskel ("sphincter") from Hamminkeln had a left-wing attitude, but had no (directly) political lyrics. Some of them got popular outside the punk scene, but were often criticized by the punk scene for being too trivial. Around the same time, more German hardcore bands started singing in English and got popular outside of Germany, like the Spermbirds from Kaiserslautern or Jingo de Lunch from West Berlin.

East Germany 

Because of repressions by the state of East Germany, there was only a secret punk scene that could develop there. One of the most popular bands were probably , who also got popular in West Germany. Only in the last years of the German Democratic Republic did the government allow some bands like Feeling B or Die Skeptiker from East Berlin, but those bands were criticized in the scene for cooperating with the government. Some of these bands applied for and received "amateur licenses" to allow them to perform in state-sanctioned venues, while still maintaining connections with the underground East German punk community.

1990s 

After the German reunification in 1990, the political situation in the east of Germany changed dramatically, and several groups of neo-nazis were founded. There were attacks against immigrants, like in Rostock-Lichtenhagen, Mölln or Solingen in the west of Germany. This new wave of neo-Nazism in Germany led many punk bands from the 1980s to reunite and release new albums, for example Slime, who released their final LP "Schweineherbst" in 1994, of which the title track is a furious rant against politicians and citizens who ignore the new dangers of neo-Nazis in Germany. Other popular bands like Toxoplasma also got active again, and newer political bands like WIZO or ...But Alive got popular, along with other "fun punk" influenced bands like Die Lokalmatadore from Mülheim an der Ruhr and Die Kassierer from Bochum. Also, many bands of eastern Germany got popular in the west.

In the following years, the punk scene stayed active in Germany and spawned many popular new bands like Terrorgruppe from Berlin or Knochenfabrik from Cologne. Some bands were influenced by heavy metal music, like Dritte Wahl from Rostock or Fahnenflucht. The most popular compilation of this period is probably "Schlachtrufe BRD" (Vol. 1-8).

Labels like Weird System are still active and release reissues of classic German punk records. Weird System have made an attempt of documenting the history of German punk with their compilation series "Punk Rock BRD" (Vol. 1-3). Today, there are many punk rock concerts and big festivals in Germany, like the "Force Attack" festival in Rostock, the "Punk im Pott" festival in Essen / Oberhausen or the "Punk and Disorderley" festival in Berlin. There are also a number of fanzines, for example "Plastic Bomb", "Trust" and "Ox".

Chaostage

A phenomenon of the punk scene in West Germany were the Chaostage (chaos days), which took place in the mid-1980s in Hannover and Wuppertal and were meetings of punks from all over Germany. Along with those chaos days, the Anarchist Pogo Party of Germany (APPD) was founded as a party for punks and "social parasites", but got more popular in the 1990s, when the most legendary chaos days took place in Hannover in 1994 and 1995 and resulted in huge riots and the destruction of cars and buildings. A whole supermarket was depredated and alcoholic beverages were stolen by punks. These chaos days were the main topic of TV debates and newspapers for several weeks then. Popular bands like WIZO spontaneously played a show there, and Terrorgruppe wrote a classic song about it ("Wochenendticket", named after a train ticket that most punks used in order to get to Hannover from all across the country). The APPD participated in the Bundestag elections of 1998 and 2005, but although they had only regional successes, like in Hamburg-St. Pauli, they got famous for their advertising on TV, starring Wolfgang Wendland, singer of Die Kassierer.

References

External links 

 German Punk rock discography 1977–1984
 German Punk rock discography 1985–1990
 Information about several German punk rock bands
 Many links about punk rock in Germany
 Ska / Punk Worldbeats - Concert Agenda for Berlin

 
Punk by country
German styles of music
Music scenes